Freek Vos (born 7 January 1997) is a Dutch professional basketball player, who last played for Landstede Basketbal of the Dutch Basketball League (DBL).

Professional career
Vos started his professional career with Landstede Basketbal in the Dutch Basketball League in the 2015–16 season. In his rookie year, Vos averaged 2.0 points and 2.6 rebounds in 11.2 minutes per game on his way to winning the DBL Rookie of the Year award. In the 2018–19 season, Landstede won its first DBL championship.

References

1997 births
Living people
Landstede Hammers players
Dutch men's basketball players
Centers (basketball)